Guilherme Costa Machado Silveira (born 31 March 1994), commonly known as Guilherme Costa or Guilherme, is a Brazilian footballer who plays as an attacking midfielder.

References

1994 births
Living people
Brazil youth international footballers
Campeonato Brasileiro Série A players
Campeonato Brasileiro Série B players
CR Vasco da Gama players
Clube Atlético Bragantino players
Boavista Sport Club players
Esporte Clube Vitória players
Clube de Regatas Brasil players
Association football midfielders
Footballers from Rio de Janeiro (city)
Brazilian footballers